Walnut Street Baptist Church is a Southern Baptist, Christian former megachurch in  Louisville, Kentucky. It is associated with the Southern Baptist Convention, Kentucky Baptist Convention, and the Long Run Baptist Association.

History
Walnut Street Baptist Church was founded in 1815 as the First Baptist Church in Louisville, Kentucky. In the beginning, the congregation had 18 members who met primarily in their homes. 
The congregation served the Louisville community for 30 years as First Baptist Church.

In 1845 the First and Second Baptist churches called the same Pastor and the two congregations merged and built a facility on the corner of Fourth and Walnut Street (now called Muhammad Ali Boulevard) in Louisville. The newly merged congregation's sanctuary could seat  600. It remained in this location until 1902. It was decided to move as the congregation had outgrown its facility with Sunday school attendance topping 1000.
At this time Walnut Street Baptist Church moved to its present location on the corner of Third and Saint Catherine Streets in what is now Old Louisville. By this time it was considered by some to be the largest church in the South. As the 20th century progressed the church grew to encompass over two city blocks. By the 1960s the congregation was responsible for starting directly or indirectly 78 churches in the Long Run Association encompassing the Louisville area.

In the 1970s and 1980s, this racially diverse downtown congregation stayed in its location despite over two-thirds of the congregation living outside the downtown corridor. Expanded inner-city and activities ministries were added at this time to adapt to urban ministry in the latter part of the century. Peak attendance in this period exceeded 3,500 in Sunday School and weekly worship.

The 1970s also saw the beginning of the Living Christmas Tree which continued until 2006. This Annual "gift to the city" of choral and instrumental performance was free and drew on average 35,000 to its 16 performances at its peak.

In the 1990s the congregation recommitted itself to its downtown philosophy by undertaking a multimillion-dollar campus update. Today the congregation has active ministries including a retirement home, subsidized apartments, a counseling center, weekly worship, Christian education, Christian social ministry, global mission partnerships, and recreational activities, and sustains a membership of over 2,500.  Current weekly attendance is about 350.

Other history and statistics
 One of the first churches to build a recreation center including amenities such as a bowling alley, racquetball court, skating ring, billiard hall, dining room with a capacity of 1200 and gymnasium, as well as meeting space.
 Over the course of its existence the congregation is responsible for either directly or indirectly founding 65% of the Southern Baptist churches in The Greater Louisville Area.
 Congregation and its pastors were key in the relocation of the Southern Baptist Theological Seminary to Louisville from South Carolina.
 Three former pastors have been the President of the Southern Baptist Convention.
 The TV ministry has 40,000 viewing households weekly.
 Congregation was responsible for the foundation of the Kentucky Baptist Homes for children.

Notes

References
 Official Web Site 	 
 Ky Baptist Convention Listing 	 
 Info from Baptist Press 	 
 Some historical Notes 	 
 Vintage Post Cards of Old Louisville - Walnut Street Baptist Church 	
  	 
  	 
 Reference in Text Book  	 
 Baker, Robert. ed. A Baptist Source Book. Nashville, Tenn.: Broadman Press, 1966. 
 Leonard, Bill J. "COMMUNITY IN DIVERSITY : A HISTORY OF THE WALNUT BAPTIST CHURCH 1815 - 1990" Louisville, Ky. Simons - Neely Publishing Co 1990 096277880X

Churches in Louisville, Kentucky
Baptist churches in Kentucky
Religious organizations established in 1815
Churches completed in 1845
Churches completed in 1902
1815 establishments in Kentucky